The Greens–Ecologist Left of the Valencian Country (EV–EE) was a green political party in the Valencian Community founded in 2004 as a split from The Greens (EV/LV), in response to EV/LV's alliance with the Spanish Socialist Workers' Party (PSOE) for both the 2004 Spanish general and European Parliament elections.

In 2014 it joined with Equo's regional branch to form Greens Equo of the Valencian Country.

References

2004 establishments in Spain
Defunct political parties in Spain
Green political parties in Spain
Political parties established in 2004
Political parties disestablished in 2014